Hosabettu is a village in Dakshina Kannada District in the Indian state of Karnataka. It is located near Moodbidri and Mangalore.

Demographics
As of 2011 India census, Hosabettu had a population of 2,260. Males constitute 48.45% of the population and females 51.55%. Hosabettu village has geographical area of 1006.63 hectares with 498 families residing in it. The average sex ratio was 1064. Hosabettu had an average literacy rate of 90.3%, higher than the national average of 74.04%: male literacy was 94.3%, and female literacy was 86.6%. In Hosabettu, 8% of the population was under 6 years of age. Languages are primarily Tulu, Konkani and Kannada.

Also there is another place by same name Hosabettu a residential locality near Surathkal coming under Mangaluru City Corporation limits. This Hosabettu adjoins national highway 66 ( previously NH-17 ) running from Panvel (near Mumbai city) to Kochi (Cochin).

References

Villages in Dakshina Kannada district